Burnaby is an English surname. Notable people with the surname include:

 Algernon Edwyn Burnaby (1868–1938), English landowner and Master of the Quorn Hunt
 Andrew Burnaby (1732–1812), English clergyman and travel writer
 Davy Burnaby (1881–1949), British stage and film actor
 Edwyn Burnaby (1798–1867), English landowner and British Army officer
 son Edwyn Sherard Burnaby (1830–1883), British Army general and Member of Parliament; son of the above
 Frederick Gustavus Burnaby (1842–1885), English army officer and traveller
 John Burnaby (1891–1978), Anglican clergyman and Regius Professor of Divinity at Cambridge University
 Louisa Cavendish-Bentinck (née Caroline Louisa Burnaby, 1832–1918), daughter of Edwyn Burnaby and great grandmother of Queen Elizabeth II
 Robert Burnaby (1828–1878), British Columbian politician
 William Burnaby (disambiguation)
 Sir William Burnaby, 1st Baronet (c. 1710–1776), British naval officer